The Finnish men's national inline hockey team is the national men's inline hockey team for Finland. Finland was one of the most successful teams at the IIHF Inline Hockey World Championships, which were organized during 1996 to 2017 until the tournament was discountinued by the International Ice Hockey Federation (IIHF) in 2019. The tournament was organized annually during 1996 to 2015, with the exception of the year 1999. Starting from 2017, the tournament was to be held every other year but, after being forced to cancel the 2019 edition due to lack of interested hosts, the IIHF voted in June 2019 to end its governance over inline hockey, ending the organization’s involvement in any future inline hockey tournaments. Finland won a total of thirteen medals in nineteen tournaments. At the 2017 IIHF Inline Hockey World Championship in Bratislava, the final tournament organized by the IIHF, the team finished in second place.

World Championship results by year

Source: IIHF

References 

National inline hockey teams
Inline hockey
Inline hockey in Finland
Men's sport in Finland